The  Santa Cruz River is a river of Santa Catarina state in southeastern Brazil. It is part of the Uruguay River basin.

See also
List of rivers of Santa Catarina

References
 Map from Ministry of Transport

Rivers of Santa Catarina (state)